Álex Adolfo Figueroa Muñoz (20 September 1961 – 25 December 2018) was a Chilean politician and physician who served as Minister of Health (1996–2000).

References

1961 births
2018 deaths
20th-century Chilean physicians
Chilean Ministers of Health
20th-century Chilean politicians
21st-century Chilean politicians
Christian Democratic Party (Chile) politicians
Pontifical Catholic University of Chile alumni
Polytechnic University of Catalonia alumni